Assumption Mutual Life Insurance Company, operating as Assumption Life, is a Canadian life insurance and asset management company based in Moncton, New Brunswick.

History
The company was established in 1903 by Acadians in Massachusetts as la Société l'Assomption, a small life insurance agency. The company moved to Moncton in 1913 and up until 1969 the company was run as a fraternal society before becoming a mutual organization. In 1972, Assumption Life moved into their new head office in Moncton, Assumption Place, which is by far the tallest building in the city.

Subsidiaries
Assumption Life has majority control over the following companies:
 Louisbourg Investments Inc., an investment portfolio management firm with over 1.4 billion dollars of assets under management.
 Assumption Place Ltd., A real estate holding company which owns the company's head office in Moncton (Assumption Place) along with other properties in Moncton and Edmundston, New Brunswick
 Atlantic Holdings (1987) Ltd.

See also
 Michel Bastarache
 List of companies headquartered in Moncton

References

External links
 Official website

Financial services companies established in 1903
Companies based in Moncton
Life insurance companies of Canada
Mutual insurance companies
1903 establishments in Massachusetts